Majid is a pan-Arab comic book anthology and children's magazine published in Abu Dhabi, United Arab Emirates by the Abu Dhabi Media Company. It was first issued on 28 February 1979.

History and profile
Majid has been in circulation and has been released on a weekly basis since 28 February 1979 until the end of 2019. From the beginning of 2020 it is scheduled to be issued monthly. Majid magazine launched its website in 2009 and launched its TV channel in 2015.

Majid is widely read in most Arab states, and had a weekly distribution of 175,000 as of 2005. One of the series in Majid is Kaslan Jiddan (كسلان جداً lit. Very Lazy), a story of a boy named Kaslan, who tries to act like an adult and finds himself in conflicts because of it.

Characters
 Popular American comic strip Nancy was translated in the magazine for many years as The Lovely Mouza and Her Brother Rashoud.

References

External links
  

1979 establishments in the United Arab Emirates
Arabic-language magazines
Comics anthologies
Children's magazines published in the United Arab Emirates
Magazines established in 1979
Mass media in Abu Dhabi
1979 comics debuts